David Müller may refer to:

David Müller (footballer, born 1984), German football player
David Müller (footballer, born 1991), German football player
David Heinrich Müller (1846–1912), Austrian orientalist

See also
David Muller (disambiguation)